Niles Spencer (16 May 1893 – 15 May 1952) was an American painter of the Precisionist School who specialized in depicting urban and industrial landscapes. His works are in the permanent collections of several major museums including the Metropolitan Museum of Art, the Whitney Museum of American Art, and MoMA.

References

Further reading
Marling, Karal Ann and Jeffers, Wendy  (1990). Niles Spencer. Whitney Museum of American Art

External links
Paintings by Niles Spencer
The Dormer Window, 1927 (The Phillips Collection)
Near Avenue A, 1933 (MoMA)
Waterfront Mill, 1940 (Metropolitan Museum of Art)
Six works by Niles Spencer, including The Green Table, 1930 and Ventilators, 1948 (Whitney Museum of American Art)

20th-century American painters
American male painters
Precisionism
People from Pawtucket, Rhode Island
Rhode Island School of Design alumni
1893 births
1952 deaths
20th-century American male artists
Section of Painting and Sculpture artists